= Oahuan =

Oahuan may refer to:

- A person from the Hawaiian island of Oʻahu
- The Punahou School (9–12) student yearbook The Oahuan
